Osiedle Przyjaźni ("Friendship Estate") is a part of the Szczecin City, Poland situated on the left bank of Oder river, west of the Szczecin Old Town and Middle Town.

Neighbourhoods of Szczecin